Zaragoza en Común (Spanish for Zaragoza in Common, ZGZ) is a municipalist movement aimed at "creating, from the confluence of people and political and social organizations, a new social majority to win the city for the people".

It was created in 2015, to contest the 2015 local elections in the city of Zaragoza. In these elections, Zaragoza en Común won 24.6% of the vote (representing the second largest share) and 9 members in the city council. Its leader Pedro Santisteve was elected mayor of Zaragoza on June 13, 2015 with the votes of ZGZ, the Spanish Socialist Workers' Party (PSOE) and the regionalist Chunta Aragonesista.

In the elections on May 26, 2019, ZGZ received only 10% of the votes and lost 6 of their 9 seats in the council and the candidate of the conservative People's Party was elected by the council in June.

Member parties
 United Left of Aragon (IU)
 Social activists
 We Can (Podemos, left in 2019)

Electoral results

References

Podemos (Spanish political party)
United Left (Spain)
Political parties in Aragon
Political parties established in 2015
Political party alliances in Spain
2015 establishments in Aragon